Walter T. Margetts (January 23, 1904 – March 26, 1983) was the Treasurer of the state of New Jersey from April 1949 to January 1954. His wife was assemblywoman Josephine Margetts.

References 

1904 births
1983 deaths
State treasurers of New Jersey